Dick Hermann (born July 11, 1942) is a former American football linebacker. He played for the Oakland Raiders in 1965.

References

1942 births
Living people
American football linebackers
Florida State Seminoles football players
Oakland Raiders players